"Hot Chilli Woman" is a song by Australian rock-pop band Noiseworks. It was released in June 1991 as the third single from their third studio album, Love Versus Money (1991), and peaked at number seven on the Australian ARIA Singles Chart.

Track listing
CD single (656944 2)

Charts

Weekly charts

Year-end charts

References

Noiseworks songs
1991 songs
1991 singles
Columbia Records singles
Songs written by Steve Balbi
Songs written by Justin Stanley